Monetary Policy Committee (MPC) may refer to:

 Monetary Policy Committee (India) of the Reserve Bank of India
 Monetary Policy Committee (United Kingdom) of the Bank of England